Checkpoint was a journal published in Melbourne, Australia, at approximately quarterly intervals, by a group of organisations associated loosely with the Liberal Party side of politics. It appeared from August 1969 (No. 1) until June 1974 (No. 16).

Overview
The journal was published by the Checkpoint Council, comprising representatives from the Deakin Group, the Melbourne University Liberal Club, Monash University liberals, and the Young Liberal Movement of Australia (Victorian Division). Its objective was inter alia "to stimulate party members and the public generally and give an intellectual base for formulating policies".

Many of its activists were young and went on to achieve parliamentary office or who were already in State or Federal Parliament.  Such individuals listed in various Checkpoint issues as being Council Members, Editors or members of the Editorial Board include:  Haddon Storey (later MLC for East Yarra, Victorian Attorney-General), Alan Missen (later Senator for Victoria), Prue Sibree (later MLA for Kew), Julian Doyle (MLA for Gisborne) Peter Falconer (later MHR for Casey), Senator Ivor Greenwood (Australian Attorney-General, Federal Minister), Tony Staley (later MHR for Chisholm, Federal Minister, Federal President of Liberal Party), Alan Stockdale (later MLA for Brighton, Treasurer for Victoria, Federal President of Liberal Party), David Kemp (later MHR for Goldstein, Federal Minister for Education, State President of Liberal Party), Peter Block (later MLC for Boronia) and Andrew Peacock (MHR for Kooyong, leader of the Federal Opposition, Federal Minister).  Others were active simply in the Liberal Party's organisation.  A small number chose another party.

Initial funding came from advertising and modest subscription revenue. Publication ceased when revenue declined and the Checkpoint Council disbanded.

References

1969 establishments in Australia
1974 disestablishments in Australia
Defunct political magazines published in Australia
Magazines established in 1969
Magazines disestablished in 1974
Magazines published in Melbourne
Quarterly magazines published in Australia